Davidé Fabbri is an Italian comic book artist.  He has worked mainly for Dark Horse Comics on various Star Wars series. Also worked for Dynamite 
and recently for DC Comics.
In 2010, he worked on Victorian Undead, written by Ian Edginton for Wildstorm. This series pitted Sherlock Holmes and Dr Watson against a legion of undead zombies. It was nominated for a Rondo Hatton Classic Horror Awards in 2010.

"Being a fan of science fiction, and doing my work almost entirely abroad, I found it enjoyable the idea of returning from Italian readers with a publication of this kind".Davidé Fabbri talking to 'Marcello "Mars" During' about 'Kepher', an Italian comic series he illustrated all the covers for, published by Star Comics in 2012.

Published work

Writer
9-11: Artists Respond, Volume One (2002)

Penciller and Inker
Batman: Arkham Unhinged #15 (for DC Comics) Jun 12 2013 Written by 
 Operation Overlord #1-4 (2014-2015) #1 Written by Michaël Le Galli, #2-4 Written by Bruno Falba (for Glénat (publisher))

Penciller
Mutant Chronicles Golgotha #1-4 (1996 Acclaim Comics Written by William King )
Mutant Chronicles Sourcebook (1996 was #5 of the above series for Acclaim Comics) 
Starship Troopers: Insect Touch #2-3 (1997 with co-writer Warren Ellis with art by Davidé and Paolo Parente for Dark Horse Comics (collected in Starship Troopers 1998)
Starship Troopers: Dominant Species #1-4 (1998 for Dark Horse Comics Written by Jan Strnad)
Starship Troopers (1998 a collected trade paperback of above )
Star Wars Vol 5,7,28,29,30,31 and 36-41 (1998 for Dark Horse Comics)
Star Wars (1999 for Dark Horse Comics #36,37,40,42,46 and 47)
Star Wars Sonderband #10 (1999 for Dark Horse Comics Written by Randy Stradley)
Star Wars Tales #5 and #17 (1999 for Dark Horse Comics)
Xena: Warrior Princess Blood and Shadows (1999) for Dark Horse Comics written by John Wagner with pencils by Davidé and Mike Deodato, A trade paperback collects Xena #7-10, 2001)
Star Wars: Jedi Council: Acts of War #1-4 (2000 for Dark Horse Comics Written by Randy Stradley - Collected into a Trade paperback )
Planet of the Apes (Movie Adaptation) (2001 for Dark Horse Comics Written by Scott Allie)
Star Wars: Empire #3-6, 16-18 and 36-40 (2002 for Dark Horse Comics)
Star Wars: Infinities - The Empire Strikes Back #1-4 (2002 for Dark Horse Comics  - Collected into a Trade paperback ASIN: B00BHM8B7Y)
9-11 Respond, Volume One (2002)
Star Wars Omnibus #8,10 and 17 (2006 for Dark Horse Comics)
Alien vs. Predator: Sand Trap (2007) (for Dark Horse Comics Written by Mike Kennedy)
Paolo Parente's Dust (2007 for Image Comics #1 (with others) )
Jusqu'au Dernier (Star Wars Rébellion, Vol 1 'Until the last') Published 2007 by Delcourt Written by Welles Hartley  )
Brothers in Arms #1-4 (2008 Gearbox Software and Dynamite Entertainment Written by Mike Neumann, Davidé helped with plotting)
Star Wars: Luke Skywalker: The Last Hope for the Galaxy (2008 for Dark Horse a Trade paperback of various Star Wars comics )
Red Faction: Guerrilla Book #1 A Fire On Mars (2009 for Wildstorm Comics Written by 
Star Wars: Halloween Special 2009 "Planet of the Dead" (2009 for Dark Horse Written by Steve Niles It reprints Star Wars #17 and was a give-away issue)
Dust Wars #1-3 (2010 for Image Comics Written by Christopher Morrison)
Victorian Undead #1-6 (2010 for Wildstorm Written by Ian EdgintonTrade Paperback - )
Victorian Undead II: Sherlock Holmes vs Dracula #1-5 (2011 for Wildstorm Written by Ian Edginton Trade Paperback - )
Aliens: Colonial Marines - 'No Man Left Behind' (2012 for Dark Horse Comics Written by Joshua Williamson, Davidé and others provided Pin-up art to this freebie given away at San Diego Comic-Con 2012)
Free Comic Book Day - Serenity/Star Wars (2012 for Dark Horse Comics Written by Zack Whedon ) 
Star Wars: Agent Of The Empire - Hard Targets (2012 for Dark Horse Comics Written by John Ostrander, Haden Blackman, Jeremy Barlow, Chuck Dixon

Inker
Starship Troopers: Insect Touch (1997)
Starship Troopers (1998)
Starship Troopers: Dominant Species (1998)
SpyBoy (1999)
9-11 (2002)
Brothers in Arms (2008)
Victorian Undead (2010)
Victorian Undead II (2011)
Batman: Arkham Unhinged (2011)
Batman: Arkham Unhinged (2012)
Star Wars: Agent Of The Empire - Hard Targets (2012)

Colorist
Starship Troopers: Insect Touch (1997)
Starship Troopers (1998)
Star Wars (1999)
Star Wars: Empire (2002)
Star Wars: Luke Skywalker: The Last Hope for the Galaxy (2008)

Cover artist
Star Wars: Jedi Council: Acts of War (2000)
Alien vs. Predator: Sand Trap (2007)
Brothers in Arms (2008)
Kepher (2011) Star Comics (#1-8 written by Roberto Cardinal and Stefano Nocilli)
Operation Overlord (2014-2015) Glénat (publisher) (#1 Written by Michaël Le Galli, #2-4 written by Bruno Falba)

Other Work
 Provided art for Orzowei graphic novelisation by Alberto Manzi in June 1984.
Provided art for Asimov's Science Fiction magazine #2 - 18 (1994)
Provided the Italian cover for The Crack in Space novel by Philip K. Dick in 1995.
Provided art for the cover of Niccolò Ammaniti's book Fa un po' male(It's a little bad) on 1 June 2004 by Giulio Einaudi .
Provided pecilled art for The Lord of the Rings Masterpieces (sketch cards) - Topps (2006) 
Provided pencilled art for Star Wars Heritage sketch cards (2004) 
Provided pencilled art for Star Wars: Clone Wars sketch Cards (2004)
Provided pencilled art for Star Wars: Episode III – Revenge of the Sith sketch Cards (2004)
Provided art for Indiana Jones Masterpieces Trading Cards - Topps (2008)

References

External links

Bryan Talbot went on a tour of Italy in 2006 and met David Fabbri

Italian comics writers
Italian speculative fiction artists
Fantasy artists
Living people
Place of birth missing (living people)
Year of birth missing (living people)